"Damage" is the first single from the album Dress Me Slowly by Australian rock band You Am I. It was released in 2000 and reached number 37 on the Australian national chart and number 23 in that year's Hottest 100.

Track listing
 "Damage" – 3:27
 "She Don't Need the Morning" – 3:47
 "One Cent Coins" – 3:31
 "Open All Night" – 4:05

All songs by Tim Rogers.

"She Don't Need the Morning", "One Cent Coins" and "Open All Night" are all You Am I originals. "Open All Night" was originally titled "Dress Me Slowly" and was destined to appear on the album, but was left off as the band did not like having a song with the album's title on the album (despite having already done this on Sound as Ever and Hourly, Daily, as well as Deliverance and Dilettantes afterwards).

The song "Open All Night" was featured in the 2000 film Better Than Sex.

Charts

References

2000 singles
You Am I songs
Songs written by Tim Rogers (musician)
2000 songs